The 1979 IAAF World Race Walking Cup was held in Eschborn, Federal Republic of Germany, on September 29–30, 1979.  The event was also known as IAAF Race Walking World Cup.  The women's 5 km race was now officially introduced into the competition with the women's teams competing for the Eschborn Cup.

Complete results were published.

Medallists

Results

Men's 20 km

Men's 50 km

Team (men)
The team rankings, named Lugano Trophy, combined the 20km and 50km events team results.

Women's 5 km

Team (women)

Participation
The participation of 147 athletes (107 men/40 women) from  countries is reported.

 (8/4)
 (7/-)
 (-/4)
 (8/-)
 (-/4)
 (7/-)
 (8/4)
 (8/-)
 (5/-)
 (-/4)
 (8/-)
 (8/-)
 (8/-)
 (8/4)
 (-/4)
 (8/4)
 (8/4)
 (8/4)

Qualifying rounds 
From 1961 to 1985 there were qualifying rounds for the men's competition with the first two winners proceeding to the final.  This year, México, the German Democratic Republic, Italy, the Soviet Union, the United States, Australia, and New Zealand proceeded directly to the final.

Zone 1
Reus, Spain, August 25/26

Zone 2
Władysławowo, Poland, August 25/26

Zone 3
Hove, Belgium, September 3

References

World Athletics Race Walking Team Championships
World Race Walking Cup
International athletics competitions hosted by West Germany
World Race Walking Cup